Oorummadi Bratukulu is a 1976 Telugu film directed by B. S. Narayana. The film won National Film Award for Best Feature Film in Telugu

Soundtrack
Sramaika Jeevana Soundaryaniki Samanamainadi Lene Ledoyi (Lyrics: Srirangam Srinivasa Rao; Music: M. B. Srinivas; Singer: S. P. Balasubrahmanyam)

Awards
National Film Award for Best Feature Film in Telugu
Nandi Award for Best Feature Film - Gold - J. Venkatarya & G. K. Murthy

References

1976 films
1970s Telugu-language films
Best Telugu Feature Film National Film Award winners